The 5th constituency of the Loire (French: Cinquième circonscription de la Loire) is a French legislative constituency in the Loire département. Like the other 576 French constituencies, it elects one MP using a two round electoral system.

Description

The 5th constituency of the Loire covers the northernmost parts of the department around the town of Roanne.

Politically the seat has tended to support the centre right with the exceptions of 1988 and 2017.

Assembly Members

Election results

2022

 
 
|-
| colspan="8" bgcolor="#E9E9E9"|
|-

2017

2012

References

5